Retina-X Studios is a software manufacturer company that develops computer and cell phone monitoring applications, focused on computers, smartphones, tablets and networks. The company is founded in 1997 and it is based in Jacksonville, Florida, United States.

History

The company was founded in July 1997 primarily as a web consulting and design company. In 2003, after a period of developing monitoring products for outside companies, the company began creating monitoring software products using its own brand name. The first software product, named AceSpy, was released on April 28, 2003.

In May 2007, the company developed and released the first monitoring software for mobile phones, named Mobile-Spy, particularly for Windows Mobile.

Products 

 Mobile-Spy – monitoring software for mobile internet and cell phone activity.
 PhoneSheriff – parental monitoring software that allows multiple time restrictions and filtering.
 SniperSpy and SniperSpy Mac – monitoring software for Windows & Mac.
 AceSpy and AceSpy Mac – similar to SniperSpy, but doesn't have a live control panel.
 PeekTab – tablet monitoring software for iPad and Android tablets.
 Net Orbit - computer monitoring software for network.

Usage 

Target audiences for Retina-X Studios are parents and employers.

Legal 

Parents and employers use legal monitoring software to check their teens' and staff's internet use.  This is legal since juveniles are the responsibility of their parents. Company markets its products as spy applications as parents can review child's messages and call details without the child's knowledge. In some cases ethical issues can arise if employees are not made aware of monitoring tools, if personal emails are intentionally accessed and if managers are involved directly in evaluating the contents of logging activities as they can be/become biased towards the person whose email is being reviewed.

Illegal 

Using cell phones for spying has also increased due to multiplication of smart phones and compromising one's information is very possible with spy apps. People can stalk each other easily with company software.   All they need is a onetime access to the gadget and then such software would run invisibly. The wrong use of the software should not be overlooked. The hackers can access the online information that is parsed to the customer's account and this can lead to privacy issues.

See also 

 Phone surveillance
 Employee monitoring software
 Keystroke logging

References

External links
 

Software companies based in Florida
Computer security software companies
Mobile technology companies
Defunct software companies of the United States
Stalkerware